Louisiana elected its members July 7–9, 1824.

See also 
 1824 and 1825 United States House of Representatives elections
 List of United States representatives from Louisiana

1824
Louisiana
United States House of Representatives